The pandura (pandoura) or pandore, an ancient string instrument, belonged in the broad class of the lute and guitar instruments. Akkadians played similar instruments from the 3rd millennium BC. Ancient Greek artwork depicts such lutes from the 3rd or 4th century BC onward.

Ancient Greece
The ancient Greek pandoura was a medium or long-necked lute with a small resonating chamber, used by the ancient Greeks. It commonly had three strings: such an instrument was also known as the trichordon (three-stringed) (τρίχορδον, McKinnon 1984:10). Its descendants still survive as the Kartvelian panduri, the Greek tambouras and bouzouki, the North African kuitra, the Eastern Mediterranean saz and the Balkan tamburica and remained popular also in the near east and eastern Europe, too, usually acquiring a third string in the course of time, since the fourth century BC.

Renato Meucci (1996) suggests that the some Italian Renaissance descendants of pandura type were called chitarra italiana, mandore or mandola.

Roman
Information about Roman pandura-type instruments comes mainly from ancient Roman artwork. Under the Romans the pandura was modified: the long neck was preserved but was made wider to take four strings, and the body was either oval or slightly broader at the base, but without the inward curves of the pear-shaped instruments. The word pandura was rare in classical Latin writers.

Mesopotamia
Lute-class instruments were present in Mesopotamia since the Akkadian era, or the third millennium BC.

Eastern variations
There were at least two distinct varieties of pandura. One type was pear-shaped, used in Assyria and Persia.  In this type the body had graceful inward curves which led up gradually from base to neck. These curves changed at the bottom end off the instrument to a more sloping outline, an elongated triangle with the corners rounded off. The oval type, a favourite instrument of the Egyptians, was also found in ancient Persia and among the Arabs of North Africa.

Caucasus
From the ancient Greek word pandoura, a comparable instrument is found in modern Chechnya and Ingushetia, where it is known as phandar. In Georgia the panduri is a three-string fretted instrument. The modern Georganian panduri instrument is in the tanbur class.

Gallery

See also

Phandar
Tambouras
Panduri
Baglamas
Bandura
Tanbur
Mandolin

References
Citations

Bibliography

External links

Picture of a pandura, originally published 1947 in the book The Great Palace of the Byzantine Emperors by David Talbot Rice. Henry George Farmer calls the instrument "a three-stringed pandoura" in his 1949 article An Early Greek Pandore.
Website that has a history of Pandura with some good photos.

Ancient Greek musical instruments
Necked lutes